Ibbenbüren-Esch is a railway station located in Püsselbüren, a village of Ibbenbüren, Germany. The station was opened on 1 August 1889 is located on the Löhne–Rheine line. The train services are operated by  WestfalenBahn. Until 2004 the station was known as Esch (Westf).

Train services
The station is served by the following service(s):

Regional services  Rheine - Osnabrück - Minden - Hanover - Braunschweig
Regional services  Bad Bentheim - Rheine - Osnabrück - Herford - Bielefeld

Gallery

References

Railway stations in North Rhine-Westphalia
Railway stations in Germany opened in 1889
Ibbenbüren